The 1978 FIFA World Cup final was a football match played to determine the winner of the 1978 FIFA World Cup. The match was contested by hosts Argentina and the Netherlands, in the biggest stadium used in the tournament and in Argentina, the Estadio Monumental in the Argentine capital city of Buenos Aires. The match was won by the Argentine squad in extra time by a score of 3–1. Mario Kempes, who finished as the tournament's top scorer, was named the man of the match. The Netherlands lost their second World Cup final in a row, both times to the host nation, after losing to West Germany in 1974.

Route to the final

Match

Summary

The start of the final was mired in controversy, as the Dutch accused the Argentines of using stalling tactics to delay the match, causing tension to build in front of a hostile Buenos Aires crowd. The host team eventually came out five minutes late after the audience was whipped into a frenzy. The Argentines also questioned the legality of a plaster cast on René van de Kerkhof's wrist, despite him having worn it in earlier games without objections, causing the Dutch to threaten to walk off the pitch; the Italian referee, Sergio Gonella, upheld the complaints and forced Van de Kerkhof to apply extra bandage. In retaliation, the Netherlands team refused to attend the post-match ceremonies.

The match itself saw a number of fouls, and a hostile atmosphere. Ticker tape and confetti in the stadium worked its way onto the pitch. Mario Kempes scored the first goal of the match, slotting under Jan Jongbloed from 12 yards out. The Netherlands almost equalised when Rob Rensenbrink latched onto to a headed pass from René van de Kerkhof, but the shot was kept out by the boot of Ubaldo Fillol. The Dutch eventually equalised when René van de Kerkhof's cross found substitute Dick Nanninga, who headed home the equaliser. The Dutch could have won the game in the final minutes, when Rensenbrink latched onto a long ball poking a shot past Fillol, but the shot bounced off the post, and the match went to extra time. Kempes netted the eventual winner in the 105th minute after running into the box, evading two Dutch sliding tackles as he did so. Kempes' shot was saved by Jongbloed and Kempes jumped to avoid him, but the ball bounced off of Jongbloed and hit Kempes twice, first in the knee, then in the foot, before bouncing off Jongbloed's head, all before Kempes had even landed. The ball bounced high in the air, and two Dutch defenders came rushing to clear the ball from the open goal. Although the goal was officially given to Kempes, the replay from behind the goal showed that the ball might have come off Wim Suurbier last.

Daniel Bertoni sealed the game in the second half of extra time after Kempes made a long run into the box, and was tackled by a Dutch defender. The ball ricocheted several times before landing at the feet of Bertoni, who had a clear sight of goal inside the box. Jongbloed was unsighted by the ricochet, and was thus out of position, allowing Bertoni to slot in easily.

Details

References

External links
1978 FIFA World Cup Final holland78.net

1
FIFA World Cup finals
1978
1978
Final
Final
Argentina–Netherlands relations
Football in Buenos Aires
Sports competitions in Buenos Aires
1970s in Buenos Aires
June 1978 sports events in South America